Davtyan is an Armenian surname. Notable people with the surname include:

Artak Davtyan (born 1970), Armenian Major-General, currently 7th Chief of the General Staff of the Armenian Armed Forces
Artur Davtyan (born 1992), Armenian gymnast
Eleonora Davtyan, Armenian professional footballer
Gevorg Davtyan (born 1983), Armenian weightlifter
Hovhannes Davtyan (born 1983), Armenian judoka
Hovhannes Davtyan (actor) (born 1985), Armenian actor
Tigran Davtyan (born 1978), Armenian football midfielder
Vahagn Davtyan (1922–1996), Armenian poet, translator, publicist and public activist

See also
Avyan (disambiguation)

Armenian-language surnames